Pestapokalypse VI is the sixth studio album by Austrian extreme metal band Belphegor. It was produced by Andy Classen at Stage One Studio and released in 2006.

Track listing

Personnel
 Belphegor 
 Helmuth Lehner - vocals, guitars, bass guitar, arrangements
 Sigurd Hagenauer - guitars, arrangements 
 Bartholomäus "Barth" Resch - bass guitar, arrangements
 Tomasz "Nefastus" Janiszewski - drums, arrangements

 Additional musicians 
 Rachael "Hecate" Kozak - "Miasma" outro

 Production
 Andy Classen - producer, mixing, mastering
 Joe Wimmer - photography
 Seth Siro Anton - cover art

 Note
 Recorded and mixed at Stage One Studios, Kassel, Germany.

References
   

Belphegor albums
2006 albums
Nuclear Blast albums
Albums with cover art by Spiros Antoniou
German-language albums
Albums produced by Andy Classen